105 (one hundred [and] five) is the natural number following 104 and preceding 106.

In mathematics
105 is a triangular number, a dodecagonal number, and the first Zeisel number. It is the first odd sphenic number and is the product of three consecutive prime numbers. 105 is the double factorial of 7. It is also the sum of the first five square pyramidal numbers.

105 comes in the middle of the prime quadruplet (101, 103, 107, 109). The only other such numbers less than a thousand are 9, 15, 195, and 825. 

105 is also the middle of the only prime sextuplet (97, 101, 103, 107, 109, 113) between the ones occurring at 7-23 and at 16057–16073.

105 is also a pseudoprime to the prime bases 13, 29, 41, 43, 71, 83, and 97. The distinct prime factors of 105 add up to 15, and so do those of 104; hence, the two numbers form a Ruth-Aaron pair under the first definition.

105 is the number of parallelogram polyominoes with 7 cells.

In science
The atomic number of dubnium.

In other fields
105 is also:
 A Shimano Road groupset since 1984

See also
 List of highways numbered 105

References
 Wells, D. The Penguin Dictionary of Curious and Interesting Numbers London: Penguin Group. (1987): 134

Integers